Rana Shahbaz Ahmad is a Pakistani politician who had been a member of the Provincial Assembly of the Punjab from August 2018 to January 2023. He was also the Parliamentary Secretary for Livestock and Dairy Production.

Political career
He was elected to the Provincial Assembly of the Punjab as a candidate of Pakistan Tehreek-e-Insaf with the patronage of Sahibzada Mehhboob Sultan from Constituency PP-130 (Jhang-VII) in 2018 Pakistani general election.

References

External links
Punjab Assembly | Members - Members' Directory

Living people
Pakistan Tehreek-e-Insaf MPAs (Punjab)
Year of birth missing (living people)